Superficial external pudendal can refer to:
Superficial external pudendal vein
Superficial external pudendal artery